Nova (also Romanized as Novā) is a village in Qohab-e Rastaq Rural District, Amirabad District, Damghan County, Semnan Province, Iran. In 2006, its population was 31, in 8 families.

References 

Populated places in Damghan County